Krokodil (Russian: Крокодил, lit. Crocodile, informal: Крокодил. Звёзды против, lit. Crocodile. Celebrities Versus) is a game show which was broadcast on Muz-TV from February 5, 2010 to March 18, 2012 based on an associative board game "Crocodile". The game are hosted by Olga Shelest and Timur Rodriguez. The judge is Sergey Melimuk, the President of The "Crocodile" Game Assotiation.

Rules 
Two teams of the red and yellow sofas are participating. The red and yellow cards are as in the football. The yellow one is being issued for the utterance a sound, an articulation, the gathering word in parts, an argue with the judge and the swearing. If the yellow card has been shown to the player three times, the red card is issued for, but the player is eliminating. One hundred points are decreasing from his team. In Season 3 if only one red card had been shown, then one hundred points aren’t decreasing from the team.

The Description of Rounds

A Draw 
The team captains are appearing. Captains are playing in the "Rock-paper-scissors" to decide what a team’s playing a game first.

Round 1. The Warming-Up 
You must show everyday words to your team as much as possible using a sign language. Five points are added to the team if the word has been guessed correctly. If the team don’t understand a word showing by the player, then the team can say "Stop", but then five points will be decreased from the team. Each team contestant with another team appears by turn.

Round 2. Thematics 
Five topics are shown on the screen with five words in each. Depending on the difficulty the word can give you the possibility to earn from 10 to 30 points. One hundred and twenty seconds as the total time are given to each team (Season 1) and ninety seconds (Season 2), for which players must show words to your team selected the question topic and its cost. The team or player may say "Stop", but then the points will be decreased from the team that are equal to selected a word cost. In Season 3 the "Thematics" round had been replaced by the "Captain Round".

Round 2. Captain Round 
Captain must guess a phrase in forty seconds which are shown by three another players (the song title consisting of three words, byword and saying consisting of three words). If the team has guessed the phrase, then it earned twenty points. Sometimes players had to show titles of pictures, sightseeing, cuisine and gastronomy, trip, heroes of favourite books. Players line up in turn one after the other. First player shows it five seconds (twenty points are adding if the captain has guessed it), the second player shows it ten seconds and if phrase was guessed, fifteen points are added, but the third player shows it fifteen seconds and if the phrase was guessed, ten points are added.

Round 3. The Hard Round 
Each team must show a word proposed by the judge in forty seconds. In this case the player is wearing a mask or hanging on the belay of about half a meter above the floor. Forty points are given if the word is guessed correctly (Season 1, 2) and thirty points (Season 3).

Round 4. Video Round 
Famous person appears on the screen. She must show three books with a sign language (thirty seconds are given for one book). Teams must guess the books during this time. If the team guessed one book, it earns fifty points (Seasons 1 and 2) and forty points (Season 3). If one team answered incorrectly, then second team can watch video lifeline to the end and answer without a fear that another team would answer. In Season 3 persons showing books are distorted.

Round 5. An Attraction 
Each team has two attempts with forty seconds. The player standing behind the folding screen must show the movie, the cartoon or TV series to his team (the folding screen going down had been used in some episodes). If the team guesses a word correctly, it earns sixty points (Seasons 1 and 2) and fifty points (Season 3).

Round 6. The Dodgeball 
On one player from each team are appearing. The judge shows a card to them where famous person’s name is written, and then appeared players must show this person faster than another player. One minute is given to show. The team guessed the person first saves his player, but the player of another team is going away. The round is playing until one player is in one of teams. The team earns seventy five points if it guesses the person correctly (Seasons 1 and 2) and sixty points (Season 3).

When the round is over the judge announces the final score of the game. The team scored the largest number points than another, the winning team wins and receives the golden crocodile-shaped icon figures, but another has a silver ones (Seasons 1 and 2) as well as the box with "Crocodile" board game (Season 3).

Facts 
 In season 3 the record was set by rugby team for the number of points scored: 595 points.

References

External links 
 Website
 All episodes online 
 About show on Vokrug TV 
 В пасти "Крокодила" 

2010 Russian television series debuts
2012 Russian television series endings
Russian game shows
2010s Russian television series